The Daily Sarhad or Sarhad Daily is an Urdu daily newspaper published in Peshawar, in the North-West Frontier Province of Pakistan.

Introduction 

Pioneer of Urdu journalism in Pakistan, the daily Sarhad has been continuing its regular publication for the last 46 years following the principles of creative, positive and investigative journalism. Originating from Peshawar, the capital of North West Frontier Province now being renamed as Khyber Pakhtunkhwa. People consider Sarhad as a source to update themselves about the events taking place in their homeland, about their culture, language and traditions. Reading Sarhad is part of their daily routine, as it contains a lot of informative and educative material about Pakistan. Its covers news, analysis, political comments, articles on different topics, research articles and material on Urdu literature, culture and customs.

Background 

The paper was founded in 1970 by Hafeez Ulfat, a well-reputed, well known and elderly figure in the field of Journalism in Pakistan on the advice and with the cooperation of outstanding writers, journalists and intellectuals of the area. The paper was then gradually joined by many other prominent journalists. The daily Sarhad introduced computers in the field of journalism in (NWFP) Pakhtoonkhwa inaugurated by Aftab Ahmad Khan Sherpao the head of Pakistan Peoples Party (Sherpao).

Policy 

The paper has been toeing a three pronged policy to further its mission and objectives about journalism in this particular and sensitive part of the world. The three basic principles are:-

1. To create awareness and consolidate the spirit in Pakistanis for their language, literature and culture and persuade them to get development in all spheres of life;

2. To explore ways and means for peace and tranquility in the region and the world as a whole; spread the message of love and harmony and raise voice for the rights of suppressed and subjugated nations and communities;

3. To update Pakistanis on their rights and privilege and equip them with the knowledge and intellect, so as they are fully prepared to face the upcoming challenges and pace with the world in the field of science and technology.

Practice and performance 

Following these three basic principles the paper has achieved many distinctions and appreciations from its readers. It’s the character of the daily that its pages contain rich and valued literary articles, research papers, short stories and interesting political and non-political, humorous and entertaining columns besides varied pieces of Urdu poetry of high caliber and standard. The activities of political and literary circles, both within the country and abroad are also given wide coverage in its editions through special reports.

Another note-worthy objective of the paper is to encourage immature and new writers, columnist, reporters and editors. The paper offers internship to new graduates in the field of journalism and provides them every opportunity to learn, practice and polish their journalistic skill and make headway in the field of journalism. Particular preference is accorded to Urdu writers and poets and their literary contributions are accommodated in the paper for their due encouragement. This special attention has opened up new avenues for young writers and poets, many of them after going through the process have become perfect in their respective fields and are now enjoying the status of repute. In this context many intellectuals consider Sarhad as an Academy for the young writers.

Daily Sarhad also have a remarkable contribution in the promotion and development of culture. The daily has been contributing valuable articles, features and special editions with particular focus on culture and traditions.

Daily Sarhad has been trying very cautiously to teach the lessons of moderation, justice, peace, love and brotherhood to all the nations. It has been raising voice against war, enmities, social taboos, that were harming the very fabric of Pakistani society. Daily Sarhad editorials mostly focus these issues and wish the world is peaceful and tranquil prevail over the globe thus opening vast avenues for all the nations to get progress and prosperity.

Appreciation and response 

Daily Sarhad was cheered by all for its outstanding role and services for the cause of Pakistani nation, language, culture, customs and traditions. People considers Sarhad as their spokes organ. Many national literary and media organization have also appreciated the services and role of daily Sarhad.

Progress and development 

The daily has in the recent years achieved remarkably in all its spheres, particularly in its editorial, managerial and technical fields. Since 2001, the founder of the daily, Hafeez Ulfat has entrusted his son, Zahid Hafeez, with the overall affairs of the daily. Zahid Hafeez, has brought substantial changes in the daily to make it more reliable, attractive and read-worthy newspaper. Through his media approach, international outlook and visionary thoughts, he has given the paper a new look, making it more rich in all respects.

Daily Sarhad also publishes special editions containing valuable articles on different topics including literature, history, religion, culture, politics, health, education, economy, science and technology.

See also 
 List of newspapers in Pakistan

References

External links
Sarhad Official website

Daily newspapers published in Pakistan
Mass media in Peshawar
Publications established in 1970
Urdu-language newspapers published in Pakistan
1970 establishments in Pakistan